Odina is a rural locality (a village) in Ust-Kachkinskoye Rural Settlement, Permsky District, Perm Krai, Russia. The population was 49 as of 2010. There are 8  streets.

Geography 
Odina is located 53 km west of Perm (the district's administrative centre) by road. Ust-Kachka is the nearest rural locality.

References 

Rural localities in Permsky District